St Catherine's School, Johannesburg could refer to one of two different schools in the Greater Johannesburg metropolitan area:

 St Catherine's School, a co-educational school in Germiston on the East Rand
 St Catherine's Convent School, an all-girls school in Florida on the West Rand